The quartier Mazarin is a district in the centre of Aix-en-Provence, directly to the south of the cours Mirabeau, the principal boulevard in Aix. On the initiative of Archbishop Michel Mazarin,  brother of the Cardinal Jules Mazarin and Archbishop of Aix from 1645-8 and later himself a cardinal, city plans were devised in 1646 by Jean Lombard, director of public works, to extend the city ramparts to the south, incorporating land owned by the Archbishopric of Aix and by the Order of Saint-Jean-de-Malte. Following a grid plan of streets, the quartier contains a large number of hôtels particuliers originally built  for the nobility and wealthy merchant class.

History

Notable monuments, buildings and residents

Cours Mirabeau (south side) 

Hôtel d'Esmivy de Moissac
Maison de Vacon
Hôtel d'Isoard-Vauvenargues
Former Benedictine monastery
Hôtel Raousset-Boulbon (Hôtel Fauris de Saint-Vincens)
Hôtel de Mougins-Roquefort
Hôtel de Meryronnet Saint-Marc
Hôtel de Forbin
Hôtel de Gueydan
Hôtel d'Entrechaux
Hôtel Courtès
Hôtel Maurel de Pontevès (Hôtel d'Espagnet)
Hôtel de Suffren
Hôtel Saint-Ferréol
Hôtel Gassendi
Hôtel de Perrin

Rue Mazarine
Hôtel de Ribbe
Hôtel de Marignane
Hôtel de Guillebert de la Lauzière

Rue Goyrand
Hôtel de Lagoy
Hôtel de Tressemanes
Hôtel de Félix du Muy
Hôtel de Gallifet
Hôtel de Simiane

Rue Fernand-Dol
Hôtel de Bonnet de la Baume

Place Saint-Jean-de-Malte
Church of Saint-Jean-de-Malte
Musée Granet

Rue Cardinale
Hôtel d'Agay
Hôtel de Joursanvault
Former Convent of the Pères de la Merci
Chapelle des Andrettes
Lycée Mignet

Émile Zola was a boarder at the Lycée Mignet (then the Collège Bourbon) from 1852 until 1858. There as an adolescent he formed a close friendship with Baptistin Baille and Paul Cézanne. Following the death of his father François Zola in 1847 and the subsequent collapse of his canal company in 1853, reduced means forced his mother to seek more modest accommodation in Aix. They lodged twice in the quartier Mazarin: briefly in 1853-1854 at 8 rue Roux-Alphéran (at the time rue Longue-Saint-Jean); and in 1857-1859 at 2 rue Mazarine, where Zola spent the summers of 1858 and 1859 in the small set of attic rooms.

Rue Roux-Alphéran
Former home of Ambroise Roux-Alphéran
Hôtel de Boisseulh
Hôtel de Castillon
Hôtel Silvy (Hôtel Ripert de Monclar)
Hôtel Sallier

Rue Sallier

Rue Peysonnel

Rue Laroque

Rue Joseph-Cabassol
Hôtel de Caumont

Rue du Quatre-Septembre
Academy of Science, Agriculture, Arts and Letters of Aix
Hôtel de Saizieu
Hôtel de Villeneuve d'Ansouis
Hôtel d'Olivary
Hôtel de Boisgelin
Hôtel de Pigenat
Hôtel de Valori

Place des Quatre-Dauphins
Fontaine des Quatre-Dauphins

Rue Frédéric-Mistral
Former home of Frédéric Mistral

Rue d'Italie
Hôtel de Garidel-Thoron
Outbuildings of Church of Saint-Jean-de-Malte
Former site of Church of Nôtre-Dame-de-la-Pitié and Hospital of St John of Jerusalem

Rues Maréchal-Joffre, Pavillon, Clovis-Hugues, Petit-Saint-Esprit, Saint-Joseph

Notes

References

External links 
 « Aix-en-Provence - Le quartier Mazarin », office de tourisme.
 « Le quartier Mazarin ou l'Aix du XVIIe siecle », GénéProvence.

Aix-en-Provence
Tourist attractions in Aix-en-Provence